The Primrose Path is an 1875 novel by Bram Stoker. It was the writer's first novel, published 22 years before Dracula and serialized in five installments in The Shamrock, a weekly Irish magazine, from February 6, 1875 to March 6, 1875.

The title has Shakespearean origin. A primrose path is first referred to in Hamlet and in modern usage signifies a pleasant path that leads to damnation.

Plot summary
Jerry O'Sullivan, honest Dublin theatrical carpenter, moves to London, seeking a better job. Against the better judgement of the people surrounding him, Jerry decides to go to the metropolis with his faithful wife Katey. O'Sullivan is hired as head carpenter in a squalid theatre in London, but after several misfortunes he is strongly tempted by and eventually brought down by alcohol. Unjustly suspecting his wife of infidelity, he murders her with a hammer and then cuts his throat with a chisel.

References

Bibliography
Valente, Joseph. Dracula's Crypt: Bram stoker, Irishness, and the Question of Blood. University of Illinois Press: 2002.

External links
 

1875 British novels
Novels by Bram Stoker
Novels first published in serial form
Works originally published in Irish magazines
Novels set in London
Uxoricide in fiction
Fiction about suicide